Hilary Mary Carey,  ( Beange; born 1957) is an Australian historian whose research focused for many years on the religious history of Australia. She has been professor of imperial and religious history at the University of Bristol since 2014, where her research interests include religious missions in Canada and Greenland and missions to seamen.

Early life
Carey was born Hilary Mary Beange in Perth, Western Australia in 1957. Her father, Guy Alexander Beange, was a naval aviator and her mother, Helen Patricia Beange (née Flynn), a medical practitioner working with people with intellectual disabilities. Carey graduated from the University of Sydney with a Bachelor of Arts degree and double Honours in English and History in 1980. She later was awarded a Doctor of Philosophy by the University of Oxford for her research on astrology in Medieval times.

Career
Carey taught at Macquarie University and the University of Sydney before moving to the University of Newcastle in 1991. Along with  Erin White, Carey was one of the founding editors of Women-Church: An Australian Journal of Feminist Studies in Religion. She is a founding member of the Professional Historians Association NSW (1985) and was president of the Religious History Association (2011–2013). In 2005–2006 she was Keith Cameron Professor of Australian History at University College Dublin. Concurrent with her appointment to the University of Bristol, Carey has been conjoint professor at the University of Newcastle since 2014.

Awards and recognition
In 2012 Carey was elected a Corresponding Fellow of the Australian Academy of the Humanities. Also in 2012, God's Empire was shortlisted for the Ernest Scott Prize. Carey won the Kay Daniels Award in 2020 with Empire of Hell.

Selected works

Truly Feminine, Truly Catholic: A history of the Catholic Women's League in the Archdiocese of Sydney 1913–87, University of New South Wales Press, 1987 
 In the Best of Hands: A history of the Mater Misericordiae Public Hospital & the Mater Misericordiae Private Hospital, North Sydney, 1906–1991, Hale & Iremonger, 1991 
 Courting Disaster: Astrology at the English Court and University in the Later Middle Ages, Macmillan, 1992 
 Believing in Australia: A cultural history of religions, Allen & Unwin, 1996 
 God's Empire: Religion and colonialism in the British World, c.1801–1908, Cambridge University Press, 2011 
 Empire of Hell: Religion and the campaign to end convict transportation in the British Empire 1788–1875, Cambridge University Press, 2019

References

1957 births
Living people
University of Sydney alumni
Academic staff of the University of Newcastle (Australia)
Australian women historians
Fellows of the Australian Academy of the Humanities